Enrico Pompili (born 1968 in Bolzano) is an Italian pianist.

A native of Bolzano, he won several Italian national competitions before being prized at the Dublin International Piano Competition. In 1994 he was second to Viktor Lyadov at the Hamamatsu Competition, and next year he was awarded a 2nd prize at the XIII Paloma O'Shea Santander International Piano Competition - 1st prize void. This success launched an international career starting from 1996.

He has recorded Niccolò Castiglioni (Col Legno) and Alberto Ginastera's complete piano works (Phoenix Classics). He has released a collection of solo and two piano works by American composer Michael Glenn Williams on the Stradivarius label.

References

External links
Biography on LaVerdi website
Artist's website

1968 births
Living people
Musicians from Bolzano
Italian classical pianists
Male classical pianists
Italian male pianists
Prize-winners of the Paloma O'Shea International Piano Competition
21st-century classical pianists
21st-century Italian male musicians